Adenodolichos is a genus of shrubs in the legume family Fabaceae, native to tropical Africa.

Species
, Plants of the World Online recognises the following species:
Adenodolichos acutifoliolatus 
Adenodolichos baumii 
Adenodolichos bequaertii 
Adenodolichos brevipetiolatus 
Adenodolichos caeruleus 
Adenodolichos exellii 
Adenodolichos grandifoliolatus 
Adenodolichos harmsianus 
Adenodolichos helenae 
Adenodolichos huillensis 
Adenodolichos kaessneri 
Adenodolichos katangensis 
Adenodolichos mendesii 
Adenodolichos nanus 
Adenodolichos oblongifoliolatus 
Adenodolichos pachyrhizus 
Adenodolichos paniculatus 
Adenodolichos punctatus 
Adenodolichos rhomboideus 
Adenodolichos rupestris 
Adenodolichos salvifoliolatus 
Adenodolichos upembaensis

References

 
Fabaceae genera